Vishal Thapar is an Indian sabre fencing player. He belongs to Jammu and Kashmir UT of India. He won a gold medal in commonwealth fencing championship in Australia in 2018. He will represent India in Sabre World Cup in Budapest from 11 to 14 March.

Personal life

Tournaments and medals 
After winning several national tournaments vishal took part in Commonwealth fencing championship held in Australia in 2018 and won a gold medal. He also took part in World Cup in Madrid, Spain, Asian Championship in Seoul, Korea, World Fencing Championship 2022 in Cairo, Egypt and Commonwealth Championship London in the year 2022.

References

Living people
1994 births
People from Jammu (city)
Indian male sabre fencers